The Fundamental Orders were adopted by the Connecticut Colony council on . The fundamental orders describe the government set up by the Connecticut River towns, setting its structure and powers. They wanted the government to have access to the open ocean for trading.

The Orders have the features of a written constitution and are considered by some authors to be the first written Constitution in the Western tradition. Thus, Connecticut earned its nickname of The Constitution State. The document is notable as it assigns supreme authority in the colony to the elected general court, omitting any reference to the authority of the British Crown or other external authority. In 1662, the colony petitioned the king for a royal charter, which substantially secured the colony's right to self-govern following the same form of government established by the Fundamental Orders.

History

In the year 1634, a group of Puritans and others who were dissatisfied with the rate of Anglican reforms sought to establish an ecclesiastical society subject to their own rules and regulations. The Massachusetts General Court granted them permission to settle the cities of Windsor, Wethersfield, and Hartford. Ownership of the land was called into dispute by the English holders of the Warwick Patent of 1631. The Massachusetts General Court established the March Commission to mediate the dispute and named Roger Ludlow as its head. The Commission named eight magistrates from the Connecticut towns to implement a legal system. The March commission expired in March 1636, after which the settlers continued to self-govern.

On May 29, 1638, Ludlow wrote to Massachusetts Governor Winthrop that the colonists wanted to "unite ourselves to walk and lie peaceably and lovingly together." Ludlow and other principals drafted the Fundamental Orders, which were adopted on January 14, 1639 O.S. (January 24, 1639 N.S.) and established Connecticut as a self-ruled colony. Major John Mason was a magistrate and is credited with being one of the writers of this document.

There is no record of the debates or proceedings of the drafting or enactment of the Fundamental Orders. It is postulated that the framers wished to remain anonymous because England was watchful and suspicious of this vigorous infant colony; the commission from Massachusetts had expired. The orders were transcribed into the official Connecticut Colony records by the colony's secretary Thomas Welles.

"The men of the three towns were a law only to themselves. It is known that they were in earnest for the establishment of a government on broad lines; and it is certain that the ministers and captains, the magistrates and men of affairs, forceful in the settlements from the beginning, were the men who took the lead, guided the discussions, and found the root of the whole matter in the first written declaration of independence in these historical orders."

Individual rights of the people 

The Fundamental Orders of Connecticut is a short document but contains some principles that were later applied in creating the United States government. Government is based on the rights of an individual, and the orders spell out some of those rights, as well as how they are ensured by the government. It provides that all free men share in electing their magistrates, and uses secret, paper ballots. It states the powers of the government and some limits within which that power is exercised.

In one sense, the Fundamental Orders were replaced by a Royal Charter in 1662, however, the major outline of the charter was written in Connecticut and embodied the Orders' rights and mechanics. It was carried to England by Governor John Winthrop and basically approved by the British King, Charles II. The colonists generally viewed the charter as a continuation and surety for their Fundamental Orders. Later on, the Charter Oak got its name when that charter was taken from Jeremy Adams's tavern and supposedly hidden in an oak tree, rather than it be surrendered to the agents of James II, who intended to annex Connecticut to the more centralized Dominion of New England.

Today, the individual rights in the Orders, with others added over the years, are still included as a "Declaration of Rights" in the first article of the current Connecticut Constitution, adopted in 1965.

Competing claims for the first Western constitution 

Connecticut historian John Fiske was the first to claim that the Fundamental Orders were the first written Constitution, a claim disputed by some modern historians. The Mayflower Compact has an equal claim 19 years before; however, this Order gave men more voting rights and made more men eligible to run for elected positions. Karolina Adamová, a scientific member of the Institute of State and Law of the Czech Academy of Sciences argues that the articles of the Bohemian Confederacy adopted by the General Assembly of the evangelical estates in Prague on July 31, 1619 can be considered to be the first modern constitution and simultaneously the first federal constitution in recorded history.

Footnotes

External links

 The Fundamental Orders

1639 in law
 American political philosophy literature
 English colonization of the Americas
Connecticut Colony
 Symbols of Connecticut
 Political charters
 Government of Connecticut
 United States documents
 Thirteen Colonies documents
 Constitution of Connecticut
 Constitutions of former British colonies